Sugo all'amatriciana, or alla matriciana (in Romanesco dialect), also known as salsa all'amatriciana, is a traditional Italian pasta sauce based on guanciale (cured pork cheek), pecorino romano cheese, tomato, and, in some variations, onion. Originating from the town of Amatrice (in the mountainous Province of Rieti of Lazio region), the Amatriciana is one of the best known pasta sauces in present-day Roman and Italian cuisine. The Italian government has named it a traditional agro-alimentary product of Lazio and Amatriciana tradizionale is registered as a Traditional Speciality Guaranteed in the EU and the UK.

Development
Amatriciana originates from a recipe called pasta alla gricia. In papal Rome, the grici were sellers of common edible foods, who got this name because many of them came from Valtellina, at that time a possession of the Swiss canton of Grigioni. According to another hypothesis, the name originates from the hamlet of Grisciano, in the comune of Accumoli, near Amatrice. The sauce—nowadays named also Amatriciana bianca—was, and still is, prepared with guanciale (cured pork cheek) and grated pecorino romano. At some point, a little olive oil was added to the recipe. In the 1960s, Amatriciana sauce was still prepared in this way in Amatrice itself.

The invention of the first tomato sauces (and the  likely earliest date for the introduction of tomato in the gricia, creating Amatriciana) dates back to the late 18th century.  The first written record of pasta with tomato sauce can be found in the 1790 cookbook L'Apicio Moderno by Roman chef Francesco Leonardi.

The Amatriciana recipe became increasingly famous in Rome over the 19th and early 20th centuries, due to the centuries-old connection between Rome and Amatrice. The recipe was extremely well received and rapidly went on to become a classic of Roman cuisine, even though it originated elsewhere. The name of the dish in the Romanesco dialect eventually became matriciana due to the apheresis typical of this dialect.

While tomato-less gricia is still prepared in central Italy, it is the tomato-enriched amatriciana that is better known throughout Italy and exported everywhere. While in Amatrice the dish is prepared with spaghetti, the use of bucatini has become extremely common in Rome and is now prevalent. Other types of dry pasta (particularly rigatoni) are also used, whereas fresh pasta is generally avoided.

Variants
The recipe is known in several variants depending, among other things, on the local availability of certain ingredients. In Amatrice, the use of guanciale and tomato, onion is not favoured, but is shown in the classical handbooks of Roman cuisine.  For frying, olive oil is most commonly used, but strutto (canned pork lard) is used as well. In Amatrice, the local pecorino is sometimes used as cheese.

For cheese either pecorino romano or Amatrice's pecorino (from the Monti Sibillini or Monti della Laga areas) can be used. The addition of black pepper or chili pepper is common.

See also

 List of pasta dishes
 List of pork dishes
 List of sauces

Notes

Sources

External links
New York Times article on different recipes for sugo all'amatriciana and on guanciale
Official Amatriciana sauce recipe

Cuisine of Lazio
Italian sauces
Meat-based sauces
Pasta dishes
Pork dishes
Tomato sauces
Traditional Speciality Guaranteed products from Italy